Nirupa Roy (born Kokila Kishorechandra Bulsara; 4 January 1931 – 13 October 2004) was an Indian actress who had appeared in Hindi films. Noted for her portrayals of tragedy and sorrow, Roy was known for her acting ability, and was uncharitably called the "Queen of Misery" in Hindi film circles. Roy was active from 1946 to 1999, and was best known for playing motherly roles. Roy appeared in over 250 films, and won three Filmfare Awards throughout her career, as well as being nominated for one. In 2004, Roy received the Filmfare Lifetime Achievement Award.

Early life
Roy was born as Kokila Kishorechandra Bulsara in Kalwada, Valsad, Gujarat. She married Kamal Roy at the age of 15, and moved to Mumbai. She used her married name Nirupa Roy when she entered the film industry.

Career 

In 1946, Roy and her husband responded to an advertisement in a Gujarati paper looking for actors. She was selected and started her acting career with the Gujarati film Ranakdevi (1946). The same year she acted in her first Hindi film Amar Raj. One of her popular films was Do Bigha Zamin (1953). She largely played mythological characters in the films of the 1940s and 50s. In Har Har Mahadev he played the role of Parvati Devi opposite Trilok Kapoor who played the role of Shiva and the film was the top grosser of the year. Her image of a goddess was very strong and people would visit her home and seek her blessings. Among her co-stars were Trilok Kapoor (with whom she played in eighteen movies), Bharat Bhushan, Balraj Sahni, and Ashok Kumar.

In the 1970s, her role as mother to the characters played by Amitabh Bachchan and Shashi Kapoor made her name synonymous to the impoverished suffering mother. Her role in Deewaar (1975) and its dialogues with reference to a mother and son are used as clichés.

Personal life 
In her marriage with Kamal Roy, she had two children, named Yogesh and Kiran Roy. In the years following her death, they engaged into a dispute over Roy's property and belongings, which has received much attention throughout news and media.

Death 
On 13 October 2004, Roy suffered a cardiac arrest in Mumbai, and died at the age of 73.

Several tributes and articles have been made in Roy's memory. Her dialogues from the film Deewaar became iconic, and her acting in the film along with her other notable films are considered to be a landmark in Hindi cinema.

Filmography

Selected filmography 

rani rupmati 1957

Awards and nominations

References

External links
 
 
 Obituary from rediff.com

1931 births
2004 deaths
Actresses from Gujarat
Indian film actresses
Actresses in Gujarati cinema
21st-century Indian actresses
People from Valsad district
Actresses in Hindi cinema
Filmfare Awards winners
Filmfare Lifetime Achievement Award winners
20th-century Indian actresses